Alan Stimpson (9 July 1951 – 22 August 1994) was a New Zealand cricketer. He played in twenty-four first-class and eight List A matches for Northern Districts from 1974 to 1979.

Stimpson attended Takapuna Grammar School. He was a right-arm opening bowler. His best first-class figures were 6 for 46 when Northern Districts beat Wellington in 1975–76. His most successful season was his last, 1978–79, when he took 22 wickets at an average of 27.77. He was selected in a New Zealand Invitational XI for a one-day match against the touring Australians in January 1977, which the New Zealand team won by 12 runs.

In August 1994 Stimpson's body was found on Manukau Harbour mudflats. He had been drinking and had drowned after hurting his head in a fall.

See also
 List of Northern Districts representative cricketers

References

External links
 

1951 births
1994 deaths
People educated at Takapuna Grammar School
New Zealand cricketers
Northern Districts cricketers
Cricketers from Auckland
Deaths by drowning in New Zealand
Alcohol-related deaths in New Zealand